Werrington Dive Under (also known as the Werrington Grade Separation) is a replacement dual track grade separated railway junction at Werrington Junction,  north of  railway station in Cambridgeshire, England. Completed and opened in December 2021, the dive under allows trains on the west side of the East Coast Main Line (ECML) to access the GN/GE line without conflicting with the faster passenger services on the ECML.

The dive under was constructed by a 'jacked deck' on slide paths installed in access tunnels. The curved 'jack deck', pushed into place beneath the main running lines, will be the first use of such a structure in the United Kingdom. The installation uses a patented method of construction.

Original junction
In order to use the junction trains have to cross the lines used by the fast ECML passenger services on the level and, in the case of trains to Spalding, also use the Up Fast line for three miles between Peterborough station and the junction. This can cause delay to fast passenger trains.

Railtrack, Network Rail's predecessor, recognised that the ECML was congested and so upgraded the GN/GE line to accommodate the heavy container trains to and from the east coast ports. However Werrington Junction was still a significant bottleneck.

The dive-under
In 2016 Network Rail submitted a Transport and Works Act Order (TWAO) to the Secretary of State for Transport to build either a flyover or a dive-under to avoid the fast lines north of Peterborough and allow passenger and freight trains to access all lines without affecting other faster services. In summer 2018 Chris Grayling approved the order after a public inquiry favoured the dive-under option in preference to the flyover. Initially costings were estimated to be in the region of £100 million, but the agreed cost on approval was £200 million.

This means that trains for the GN/GE line no longer need to cross the fast lines on the level, nor use the Up Fast line between Peterborough station and the junction. This equates to two extra train paths an hour in 2021, when the work was completed. This will in turn cut 21 minutes off the fastest  to  service, and 13 minutes off the fastest King's Cross to  service. It will also see an increase of 1,050 'Intercity' possible seats per hour on express trains through Peterborough.

The Spalding and Peterborough Transport Forum claimed that increasing the number of freight trains operating through Spalding would cause the level crossing barriers in the town to be down for 24 minutes of every hour. The Campaign for Better Transport praised the works and stated 

The construction will involve use of the UK's first curved box jack, which will consist of ten  sections joined together, creating a  curved box. The contractors expect to remove  of earth and the box will weigh .

The junctions at the north and south ends were connected in November 2021, as was the signalling. However, regulatory approval will mean a projected opening date in December 2021. Provision has been made for future overhead electrification works if necessary.

See also
Hitchin Flyover - a flyover at Hitchin to alleviate traffic problems in accessing the Cambridge line north of Hitchin
Nuneaton North Chord - a flyover on the West Coast Main Line at Nuneaton constructed for similar reasons
 Video of tunnel box being pushed into place

References

External links
Network Rail news release with computer generated video of the new line
TWAO government documents
Video of the box being pushed under the ECML, hosted on BBC News

Rail junctions in England
Rail transport in Cambridgeshire
Tunnels in Cambridgeshire
Peterborough
East Coast Main Line